Phyllanthus profusus is a species of plant in the family Phyllanthaceae. It is found in Ghana, Guinea, and Liberia. It is threatened by habitat loss.

References

profusus
Vulnerable plants
Taxonomy articles created by Polbot
Plants described in 1905
Taxa named by N. E. Brown